Villafranca Sicula is a comune (municipality) in the Province of Agrigento in the Italian region Sicily, located about  south of Palermo and about  northwest of Agrigento.

Villafranca Sicula borders the following municipalities: Burgio, Calamonaci, Caltabellotta, Lucca Sicula.

The Roman Catholic cardinal Salvatore Pappalardo (September 23, 1918 Villafranca Sicula  -  Dec 10, 2006 Palermo), archbishop emeritus of Palermo, is a well-known native of Villafranca Sicula.

Demographic evolution

References

Cities and towns in Sicily